Shoaib Ahmed (born 17 August 1990) is a Pakistani first-class cricketer who plays for Khan Research Laboratories. He was the leading run-scorer for Khan Research Laboratories in the 2018–19 Quaid-e-Azam One Day Cup, with 336 runs in seven matches.

References

External links
 

1990 births
Living people
Pakistani cricketers
Khan Research Laboratories cricketers
Cricketers from Rawalpindi